Polyhymno walsinghami is a moth of the family Gelechiidae. It was described by Anthonie Johannes Theodorus Janse in 1950. It is found in Namibia and South Africa (what was Orange Free State, Mpumalanga, Gauteng, KwaZulu-Natal).

References

Moths described in 1950
Polyhymno